Jyothi Krishna may refer to:

 Jyothi Krishna (director), Tamil film actor and director
 Jyothi Krishna (actress), Malayalam film actress
 Jyothi Krishna (cricketer) (born 1990), Indian cricketer